The 2020 Lanka Premier League also known as My11Circle LPL T20, for sponsorship reasons, was the inaugural edition of the Lanka Premier League (LPL) Twenty20 franchise cricket tournament in Sri Lanka. Five teams based on various Sri Lankan cities played a total of 23 matches. It was originally scheduled to start in August but was rescheduled several times due to restrictions for the COVID-19 pandemic.

On 5 November, the tournament was given the green light to go ahead, with all the matches being played at the MRIC Stadium in Hambantota, from 26 November to 16 December 2020. The opening ceremony took place before the first match. In November 2020, Indian fantasy cricket league platform My11Circle was named the title sponsor with a bid of Rs 150M (15 crore) for the tournament.

Jaffna Stallions won by 53 runs against Galle Gladiators in the final and became the inaugural Champions of LPL.

Squads
The player draft was scheduled to be held on 1 October 2020. It was later rescheduled to 9 October 2020. The draft was again rescheduled for a second time to 19 October 2020 due to the sudden spike in COVID-19 cases in the country. The squads were announced at the draft via Zoom.

South African players Faf du Plessis and David Miller alongside Englishman Dawid Malan pulled out of the tournament as they were named in the limited overs squads for the series between English and South Africa in November 2020. Pakistani players Mohammad Hafeez, Sarfaraz Ahmed and Wahab Riaz pulled out of the tournament as they were named in the 35 member Pakistan squad for the series against New Zealand in December 2020. Colin Ingram pulled out of the tournament due to his Big Bash League stint with Hobart Hurricanes while Carlos Brathwaite also withdrew from the tournament after being signed by the Sydney Sixers for the upcoming 2020-21 Big Bash League season.

Lendl Simmons replaced Carlos Brathwaite in the Dambulla Viiking team while Brendan Taylor and Johnson Charles who were initially not picked by any franchises in the draft were signed by the Dambulla Viiking to complete the six foreign players slot. Jaffna Stallions signed Kyle Abbott, Duanne Olivier and Tom Moores who were not initially part of the draft while Ravi Bopara replaced Asif Ali in Jaffna Stallions to complete its six foreign player slot. Former Indian cricketer Irfan Pathan who was not initially picked by any franchises in the draft was later signed by the Kandy Tuskers.

Manvinder Bisla who was picked by Colombo Kings in the draft had later pulled out of the tournament owing to the strict 14-day quarantine procedure to foreign players. Chris Gayle pulled out of the tournament due to a side strain and also due to failing to negotiate the contract terms with the Kandy Tuskers franchise. Lasith Malinga also withdrew citing fitness issues and lack of match practice. Ravi Bopara who was later drafted into the Jaffna Stallions squad also pulled out citing payment issues.

Canadian batsman Ravinderpal Singh was tested positive for COVID-19 after arriving at the Colombo airport. Andre Russell who also arrived with him in the same flight was kept under self-isolation. He was immediately taken to the hospital and reports yet to emerge whether he would be replaced by another player. More replacements were later announced on 20 November 2020. Sohail Tanvir who was set to play for Kandy Tuskers was replaced by Dale Steyn after testing positive for COVID-19. In later reports, it was revealed that one Pakistani player, one Indian player and one Indian television production technician whose names were not disclosed have been tested positive for COVID-19.

Venues
Initially, matches were scheduled to be held in Kandy, Dambulla and Hambantota. The possibility of moving the tournament to either Malaysia or the United Arab Emirates was once considered to circumvent the 14-day quarantine. In the end, health officials agreed to reducing the quarantine period for foreign players from 14 days to 7 days. Following the urge from health officials, all 23 matches would be held in Hambantota.

Teams and standings

Points table

Match summary

League stage

Playoffs

Semi-final 1

Semi-final 2

Final

Statistics

Most runs

Most wickets

References

External links
 Official Website 
 Series home at ESPN Cricinfo

2020 Lanka Premier League
2020 in Sri Lankan cricket
Lanka Premier League
Lanka Premier League